The Order of Zayed is the United Arab Emirates' highest civil decoration named after the first president of the UAE, Zayed bin Sultan Al Nahyan.

Recipients

References 

Zayed, Order
Awards established in 1987